Ridgeback Resources Inc. is a Calgary, Alberta-based private oil exploration and production company focused on light oil in the Bakken and Cardium resource plays, in the Western Canadian Sedimentary Basin.

On December 29, 2016, Lightstream Resources Ltd. announced the closing of its asset sale to Ridgeback Resources Inc.

Acquisition of Lightstream 
Following the announcement, all of Lightstream's directors resigned. Former president and CEO of Lightstream, John D. Wright, was appointed to Ridgeback's board of directors.

References

External links 
 

Oil companies of Canada
Natural gas companies of Canada
Companies based in Calgary
Canadian companies established in 2007
Energy companies established in 2007
Non-renewable resource companies established in 2007
2007 establishments in Alberta